The Kids & Me is the ninth studio album by Billy Preston, released in 1974, after his famous tour in Europe. This album included "You Are So Beautiful", later covered by Joe Cocker, and the hit single "Nothing from Nothing".

The album's dedication, reflected in the title, was to St. Elmo's Village, an inner-city children's recreation centre, located in mid-city Los Angeles.

Track listing
All tracks composed by Billy Preston and Bruce Fisher except where indicated.

Side One
 "Tell Me You Need My Loving" – 2:42
 "Nothing from Nothing" – 2:33
 "Struttin'" (Preston, George Johnson, Louis Johnson)  – 2:31
 "Sister Sugar" – 3:01
 "Sad Sad Song" – 2:27
 "You Are So Beautiful" – 4:44

Side Two
 "Sometimes I Love You" (Preston)  – 3:12
 "St. Elmo" (Preston)  – 2:26
 "John the Baptist" (Preston, John Schuler)  – 3:19
 "Little Black Boys and Girls" – 2:28
 "Creature Feature" (Preston, Hubert Heard)  – 3:27

Personnel 
 Billy Preston - keyboards, piano, vocals
 Tony Maiden, Joe Walsh - guitar
 Bobby Watson - bass guitar
 Al Perkins - banjo
 Kenneth Luper, Hubert Heard - keyboards
 Manuel Kellough - drums

References

1974 albums
Billy Preston albums
Albums produced by Billy Preston
A&M Records albums
Albums recorded at A&M Studios
Albums recorded at Record Plant (Los Angeles)
Albums recorded at Westlake Recording Studios